St. Mary Orthodox Christian Church is a parish of the Antiochian Orthodox Christian Archdiocese of North America located in Central Square of Cambridge, MA.

St. Mary Church adheres to the teachings and practice of the Greek Orthodox Church of Antioch specifically, and Orthodox Christianity in general.

Clergy 

V. Rev. Fr Antony Hughes is the current Pastor of St. Mary's. Current and past clergy have included:

 V. Rev. Fr Antony Hughes (1993 - present)
 Rev. Dn. Jeffrey Smith (2002 - present)
 Fr. Alexis Kouri (1989 - 1993)
 Fr. Gregory Phelan (1981 - 1989)
 Fr. George Shaheen (?)
 Fr. Paul O'Callahan (?)
 Fr. Demetri Khoury (1977)
 Fr. Anthony Sakey (1976-1977)
 Fr. David Buss (1976) 
 Fr. Athanasius Emmert (1974 - 1976)
 Fr. Nicholas Steele (1971 - 1974)
 Father John vonHolzhausen (1945 - 1971) 
 Very Reverend Alexander Deebeh (?)
 Right Reverend Basilios Abousaffie (?)
 Right Reverend Hannanias Kassab (?)
 Fr. Gabriel Barrow (?)
 Fr. Mahfouz (1928 - ?)
 Archbishop Victor, founder (1928)

External links 
 Official Website of the Archdiocese
 Official Website of the St. Mary Orthodox Church

 Greek Orthodox Church of Antioch
 Antiochian Orthodox Church in the United States